was a Japanese free-to-play otome game, developed as a collaboration between Marvelous Entertainment, Kadokawa, and Idea Factory's Otomate. It was released in Japan on May 29, 2017 for Android and iOS devices. A 12-episode anime television series adaptation by Typhoon Graphics aired between October 3 and December 26, 2017. A Nintendo Switch port of the game was planned but it was cancelled. 

On October 24, 2019, it was announced that the game will be discontinued on December 25, 2019.

Characters

Protagonist

A kind-hearted and strong-willed girl originally from Japan before she was transported to the world of Shinga. There, she meets the various armies of the Sengoku era, all of whom are members of the Gekka Tribe, mainly supernatural creatures such as vampires, werewolves and oni. Yuzuki is special in that her blood possesses an ability to initiate "Awakenings" of the members of the Gekka Tribe, to allow them to unleash the latent power of their respective race, which increases their strength greatly and virtually becomes a decisive trump card in battle. She is tasked by a certain Himemiko, to unite Shinga, a mysterious woman whose blood possessed the same qualities, in hopes of being able to return to her original world.

Vampires/Toyotomi Army

The general of the Toyotomi army. Previously, he was a peasant who rose to be under the care of Nobunaga, only to separate due to a turn of events, and now views him as an archenemy. While appearing playful and light-hearted on the surface, he possesses an extremely crafty and ruthless side, which gives him the advantage in battle. He enjoys teasing Yuzuki, affectionately calling her his "bride", and has a pet monkey named Toukichi who is always by his side. In the manga and anime series, he is the male lead.

The most level-headed and logical of the Toyotomi army, he is known for being extremely polite, diligent, and efficient with his work, specialising in filling in the routine, day-to-day tasks Hideyoshi frequently neglects. 

Hideyoshi's trusted advisor, the Toyotomi army's main strategist and Hanbee's best friend. Always calm and quiet, he was the one who advised Hideyoshi to break away from Nobunaga previously. 

The Toyotomi army's other strategist and Kanbee's best friend. He is characterised by his red umbrella, which he carries around with him everywhere, and the various butterfly patterns on his clothing. Despite his gentle and almost feminine appearance, he shares the same trait as Hideyoshi in being extremely reckless. Whenever Hideyoshi is bored, the two often play Go together.

The Toyotomi army's main fighter. Cheerful and optimistic, he is characterised by the many scars on his bare chest and his reckless behaviour. While poor at thinking and strategising, his lack of hesitation and spirit makes him a great fighter on the battlefield.

Vampires/Oda Army

The general of the Oda army and famed all over Shinga as "The Demon King of the Sixth Heaven" for his ruthless and cold demeanour. As his name portrays, he is unafraid to take risks and does not worry about how people view him, as his eyes are solely focused on uniting Shinga. He is very possessive of Yuzuki and his commanders are his biggest fans.

The kind, gentlemanly thinker in the Oda army, who mainly serves as an information relayer and reporter to Nobunaga. Previously when the Toyotomi army was still under the Oda army, he betrayed Nobunaga but failed to kill him, instead earning the latter's praise. Since then, out of guilt, he has continued to serve faithfully as his position. 

The youngest commander, and the first to warm up to Yuzuki in the Oda army. He deeply respects Nobunaga and helps out around the castle whenever he can, whether it is something as simple and gruelling as housework. Like Hanbee, he has a very feminine appearance.

The Oda army's main fighter, who often goes head-to-head with Toshiie in battle. While he may appear rough and violent on the battlefield, he actually harbours a very emotional and kind heart, and is often very concerned over Yuzuki's adaptation to life in Shinga due to her coming from another world.

A commander in the Oda army who specialises in observing the battlefield. He carries a sharp tongue to his fellow commanders and often reprimands Yuzuki for her carelessness and forgetfulness. Like Nobunaga, he is very possessive of her.

Werewolves/Uesugi Army

The highly righteous and dignified general of the Uesugi army. His most distinguishing characteristic is his strong belief in his morals, which he bases his army's goals upon. He is very traditional and enjoys activities such as poetry and playing the biwa.

A commander in the Uesugi army known for his strength in battle. While brash and poor at calculations, he harbours a kind and helpful heart when it comes to his fellow comrades. A running gag is when he always requests for Kagemochi's help when it comes to dealing with women, in particular Yuzuki.

The Uesugi army's resident "smooth man" due to his politeness and main strategist. He is easily suspicious of unfamiliar people, making him out to be very intelligent and cautious. He is also very shrewd when it comes to dealing with others and is highly aware of what goes on in the castle. A running gag is when Kageie always requests for his help when it comes to dealing with women, in particular Yuzuki.

Kenshin's foster child. Due to him being the future heir to the Uesugi clan, he has a lot of pressure and expectations placed on him, often causing him to have moments of self-doubt. His personality is relatively similar to his father's in that they are both very gentle and serious when it comes to duty, but he tends to be a lot more trusting. He is also the first to warm up to Yuzuki upon her arrival in the Uesugi army.

A commander in the Uesugi army known for his strong suit in diplomacy. While appearing rough and stern at first glance, he simply just has a harsh way of talking, a strong sense of responsibility and plenty of confidence in himself and his comrades, which often give encouragement to the army.

Werewolves/Takeda Army

The general of the Takeda army. Passionate and warm, he carries himself with great pride as the leader, but actually suffers from an incurable disease, which he takes pills to suppress. He harbours a rivalry with Kenshin, and has a hobby of making nice-smelling sachets, which he often gifts to Yuzuki.

The youngest and most hot-blooded commander of the Takeda army. He is often extremely active and frequently trains to improve his strength with Nobuharu in the gardens. Being the youngest and the most "innocent", he is often teased whenever it comes to contact with Yuzuki. 

The shy commander and primary herbalist of the Takeda army, who is also responsible for making the pills Shingen frequently consumes. His eyes are always closed and due to his weak presence, he often surprises his comrades by seemingly appearing next to them suddenly. He kindly offers to teach Yuzuki how to be a herbalist when she enters the Takeda army. 

The brusque and good-natured commander of the Takeda army. He is primarily seen training Masakage and his strength in battle is well-known.

Werewolves/Sanada Army

The kind-hearted and warm general of the Sanada army, and also Nobuyuki's younger brother. Previously, the Sanada army was under the Takeda army, but he chose to separate after deciding that his fellow commanders were more precious to him. He is well-known for being openly generous, which is uncharacteristic of a warlord.

The second-in-command of the Sanada army and Yukimura's older brother. He often reprimands Yukimura whenever the latter gets too reckless and is commonly the one that has to step in whenever Sasuke and Saizō argue.

A ninja in the Sanada army noted for his wind techniques and childlikeness. He often quarrels with Saizō.

A ninja in the Sanada army noted for his earth techniques and narcissism. He often quarrels with Sasuke.

 A ninja in the Sanada army noted for his use of two chained sickles, which is an uncommon weapon. Unlike his two energetic partners, he is often sleepy, air-headed, calm, and has a very poor sense of direction.

Werewolves/Date Army

The crafty and ruthless general of the Date army. Known as the "One-eyed Werewolf" due to his eyepatch and hair covering his right eye, he harbours a sharp tongue, but in actuality has a soft heart. These were brought about by his education that a commander must always say the contrary of what he feels. Due to the Date army's small size, he is determined to make a name for themselves out there and is unafraid of stooping to methods like manipulation and backstabbing. He is also an extremely good cook and practises falcon-hunting.

The childlike and youngest commander of the Date army. Playful and energetic, he is considered a prodigy for his battle skills and abilities at his age, which can make him sometimes a bit arrogant. He often trains with Kojūrō.

The oldest commander of the Date army, who often acts like a mother to the other two. He is often seen training Shigezane or handling routine tasks in the castle. Whenever Masamune feels doubtful of himself, he performs the flute for him.

Ogres/Mōri Army (Game only)

Media

Anime
A 12-episode anime television series adaptation by Typhoon Graphics aired between October 3 and December 26, 2017. The series was streamed with English subtitles by Crunchyroll.

References

External links
 
 

2017 anime television series debuts
2017 video games
Android (operating system) games
Anime television series based on video games
IOS games
Japan-exclusive video games
Kadokawa Dwango franchises
Marvelous Entertainment franchises
Otome games
Sengoku video games
Typhoon Graphics
Vampires in anime and manga
Video games about vampires
Video games developed in Japan
Anime and manga about werewolves
Werewolf video games
Cancelled Nintendo Switch games